

179001–179100 

|-bgcolor=#f2f2f2
| colspan=4 align=center | 
|}

179101–179200 

|-bgcolor=#f2f2f2
| colspan=4 align=center | 
|}

179201–179300 

|-id=221
| 179221 Hrvojebožić ||  || Hrvoje Božić (born 1954) is a Croatian astrophysicist at Hvar Observatory and major contributor to the development of astronomy education in Croatia. || 
|-id=223
| 179223 Tonytyson ||  || J. Anthony Tyson (born 1940), an American physicist and astronomer, who discovered distant, faint blue galaxies using CCDs in the 1970s. He was instrumental for the establishment of the Vera C. Rubin Observatory and directed the project for 15 years (Src). || 
|}

179301–179400 

|-bgcolor=#f2f2f2
| colspan=4 align=center | 
|}

179401–179500 

|-id=413
| 179413 Stevekahn ||  || Steven Kahn (born 1954) is an American physicist and x-ray astronomer. On ESA's XMM-Newton space observatory, he was a principal investigator for the Reflection Grating Spectrometer (RGS). He was also a director of the Vera C. Rubin Observatory and led the construction of its large camera. || 
|}

179501–179600 

|-id=593
| 179593 Penglangxiaoxue ||  || Penglang Elementary School is located in Kunshan City, Jiangsu Province, China. It was founded in 1906. It is located near to the Purple Mountain Observatory. || 
|-id=595
| 179595 Belkovich ||  || Oleg Belkovich (1934–2020) is recognized worldwide for his work on the radar observations of meteors || 
|}

179601–179700 

|-id=647
| 179647 Stuartrobbins ||  || Stuart J. Robbins (born 1983) is a Senior Research Scientist at the Southwest Research Institute. He served as a Science Team Planning Liaison for the New Horizons mission to Pluto. || 
|-id=678
| 179678 Rietmeijer ||  || Frans J. M. Rietmeijer (born 1949), Dutch-American planetary geologist and research professor at the University of New Mexico || 
|}

179701–179800 

|-id=764
| 179764 Myriamsarah || 2002 SC || Myriam Ory (born 1998) and Sarah Ory (born 2000), daughters of Swiss amateur astronomer Michel Ory who discovered this minor planet || 
|}

179801–179900 

|-id=874
| 179874 Bojanvršnak ||  || Bojan Vršnak (born 1957), a Croatian astrophysicist at the Hvar Observatory and a professor of physics at the University of Zagreb, who has published textbooks on plasma physics and contributed to astronomy education in Croatia. || 
|-id=875
| 179875 Budavari ||  || Tamas Budavari (born 1973), a Hungarian physicist with the Sloan Digital Sky Survey || 
|-id=876
| 179876 Goranpichler ||  || Goran Pichler (born 1946), a Croatian physicist who contributed to the development of astronomy education and popularization in Croatia. He is also a fellow of the Croatian Academy of Sciences and Arts. || 
|-id=877
| 179877 Pavlovski ||  || Krešimir Pavlovski (born 1954) is a Croatian astrophysicist and emeritus professor at the University of Zagreb, who has contributed to astronomy education in Croatia. || 
|}

179901–180000 

|-bgcolor=#f2f2f2
| colspan=4 align=center | 
|}

References 

179001-180000